Myeon may refer to

Korean noodles
Myeon (administrative division) in North Korea and South Korea